Karl Smith (born 15 September 1959) is a Jamaican track and field athlete specializing in the hurdles.  He ran for his native country in the 1984 Olympics in the 400 metres hurdles and on their 4 × 400 metres relay team.  In the hurdles, he finished behind medalists Danny Harris and Harald Schmid in the semi-final round, not qualifying for the final.

The top Jamaican hurdler in his day, Smith is still ranked #19 all time.

Smith has continued to run hurdles in Masters athletics, holding the world record in the 110 metres hurdles.

References

External links
 

Jamaican male hurdlers
Jamaican male sprinters
Athletes (track and field) at the 1982 Commonwealth Games
Commonwealth Games competitors for Jamaica
Athletes (track and field) at the 1984 Summer Olympics
Olympic athletes of Jamaica
1959 births
Living people
World record holders in masters athletics
Competitors at the 1982 Central American and Caribbean Games
Central American and Caribbean Games silver medalists for Jamaica
Central American and Caribbean Games medalists in athletics